Saksild is a village in Jutland, Denmark. It is located in Odder Municipality.

History
Saksild is first mentioned in 1203 as Saxwæl. Saksild Church was built around year 1200.

References

Odder Municipality
Cities and towns in the Central Denmark Region
Villages in Denmark